Christian Thondike Mejías (born ) is a Cuban male volleyball player. He is part of the Cuba men's national volleyball team. On club level he plays for Afyon Belediyespor of Turkish Men's Volleyball League.

Career
His career started in La Habana in Cuba.

In September 2020, Mejías signed with Barkom-Kazhany of the Ukrainian Super League.

References

External links
  at volleybox.net

2001 births
Living people
Cuban men's volleyball players
VC Barkom-Kazhany players